Kirill Viktorovich Sarayev (born 21 May 1997) is a Russian football player. He plays for FC Chelyabinsk.

Club career
He made his debut in the Russian Professional Football League for FC Dynamo Kirov on 20 April 2016 in a game against FC Chelyabinsk.

He made his Russian Football National League debut for FC Tekstilshchik Ivanovo on 7 July 2019 in a game against FC Yenisey Krasnoyarsk.

References

External links
 
 
 Profile by Russian Professional Football League

1997 births
People from Syzran
Living people
Russian footballers
Association football defenders
PFC CSKA Moscow players
FC Dynamo Kirov players
FC Tekstilshchik Ivanovo players
Sportspeople from Samara Oblast